Harrison Bryce Jordan Barnes (born May 30, 1992) is an American professional basketball player for the Sacramento Kings of the National Basketball Association (NBA). He played college basketball for the North Carolina Tar Heels before being selected by the Golden State Warriors in the first round of the 2012 NBA draft with the seventh overall pick. Barnes won an NBA championship with the Warriors in 2015.

High school career

Harrison Barnes was rated as the number 1 player in the class of 2010 by Scout.com and in the ESPNU 100. He was rated as the number 2 player by Rivals.com. In his junior year, Barnes and teammate Doug McDermott led Ames High School to an Iowa 4A state championship where he had 24 points and 8 rebounds in the final, capping off a 26–0 season. In his senior year, Barnes and McDermott led Ames to a 27–0 season and a second straight Iowa 4A state championship becoming Iowa's big-school class's first team to go undefeated in consecutive seasons. In the finals he scored 19 points against Southeast Polk. He averaged 27.1 points, 10.4 rebounds, 4.0 steals and 4.0 assists during his senior year and was selected to the USA Today All-USA First Team. Barnes capped off his Ames High School career as their all-time leading scorer with 1,787 points. Barnes played in the 4th annual Boost Mobile Elite 24 Hoops Classic where he scored 18 points for Skip to My Lou.

On January 20, 2010, it was announced that Barnes was selected to the 2010 Junior National Select Team. The team played at the 2010 Nike Hoop Summit at the Rose Garden in Portland, Oregon, on April 10. He was also selected to play in the 2010 McDonald's All-American Game where he led the West team to a 107–104 victory. He scored a team high 18 points and was named co-MVP with Jared Sullinger. He also played in the 2010 Jordan Brand Classic where he was named co-MVP with Kyrie Irving. On March 10, 2010, Barnes won the Morgan Wootten Player of the Year Award, which goes to the nation's top player.

Barnes completed nine advanced placement credits before graduating high school.

AAU
Barnes played for All Iowa Attack and Howard Pulley Panthers (MN) on the AAU Circuit, along with football prospect Seantrel Henderson.

College recruitment

|}

Barnes considered offers from Duke, Iowa State, Kansas, North Carolina, Oklahoma, and UCLA. Barnes unofficially visited Kansas twice, for Late Night in the Phog in October 2008 and a spring game against Tennessee. Barnes took official visits to North Carolina, Duke, Kansas, UCLA, and Oklahoma, but he did not take an official visit to Iowa State; since he lived only a mile from campus, he chose to unofficially visit instead. On November 13, 2009, Barnes Skyped coach Roy Williams of North Carolina to announce his decision to join the Tar Heels.

College career

Barnes had 21 points in his North Carolina debut in an exhibition game in the Bahamas against the Commonwealth Bank Giants. UNC won the game 130–87. Overall, Barnes averaged 22 points and 6.5 rebounds per game for UNC in the Bahamas. On November 1, 2010, Barnes was named a preseason All-American by the AP. Barnes had 14 points and 4 rebounds in his North Carolina debut vs. Lipscomb. He recorded his first career double double on December 11, 2010, scoring 19 points and snatching 10 rebounds in a 96–91 victory over Long Beach State University. Barnes developed a knack for coming up clutch in the later portion of his freshman season, like when he scored eight of his twelve points in the closing minutes to help the Tar Heels beat Virginia Tech. Barnes made the eventual game winning, three-point shot against Miami to give the Tar Heels the lead with 6.6 seconds remaining in the game. Just weeks later in the Tar Heels game at Florida State, Barnes nailed a three-point shot to give the Tar Heels the victory.
Barnes' second season with the Tar Heels was also successful.  He led the team in scoring 16 of their 38 games, helping the team to the ACC regular season title, the final of the ACC tournament, and the elite 8 of the NCAA tournament.
Barnes set a career high of 26 points against Boston College on February 1, 2011. He surpassed this mark on March 12, 2011, in an ACC tournament game against Clemson, scoring 40 points while also grabbing 8 rebounds. Additionally, Barnes's 40-point performance set the record for points by a freshman in an ACC Tournament game. On April 18, 2011, Barnes announced that he would return to North Carolina for his sophomore season despite being projected as a lottery pick for the 2011 NBA draft. Barnes was seen as the potential first pick along with Jared Sullinger , Kyrie Irving and Derrick Williams .

Barnes was the ninth player in school history to earn ACC Rookie of Year recognition and the fourth to do so under Coach Roy Williams. Barnes scored the most points as a freshman in the ACC tournament since Phil Ford scored 78 points in 1975. In the NCAA tournament, he scored 84 points, the most points of any UNC freshman in history.

Professional career

Golden State Warriors (2012–2016)

2012–13 season: All-Rookie honors

On March 29, 2012, Barnes announced that he was entering the 2012 NBA draft along with Tyler Zeller, Kendall Marshall, and John Henson. He worked out with four teams: Cleveland Cavaliers, Charlotte Bobcats, Washington Wizards, and Toronto Raptors. He was selected 7th overall by the Golden State Warriors.

Warriors coach Mark Jackson said that Harrison Barnes was able to defend all five positions on the floor. In game four of the second round of the 2013 NBA Playoffs on May 12, Barnes scored 26 points and added 10 rebounds. On May 14, the NBA named Barnes to the 2012–13 All-Rookie first team. Barnes also placed sixth in NBA Rookie of the Year voting, in a tie with Chris Copeland (8 points total).

2013–14 season: Sixth man
With the arrival of Andre Iguodala, Barnes became a reserve player. Barnes again participated in BBVA Compass Rising Stars Challenge. He was chosen as a starter for Team Hill. Barnes finished the game with 16 points, 3 rebounds, 3 assists and 2 steals in 23 minutes in the team's win. On April 16, 2014, Barnes scored a career-high 30 points against the Denver Nuggets in the final regular season game for the Warriors. The Warriors finished the regular season with a 51–31 record, going into the playoffs as the sixth seed in the West, but went on to lose to the Los Angeles Clippers 4–3 in the first round.

2014–15 season: Championship season
Under new head coach Steve Kerr, Barnes moved back into the starting lineup and had an immediate impact. On March 18, 2015, he scored a season-high 25 points in a 114–95 win over the Atlanta Hawks. On April 2, he hit a running shot in the lane with less than a second remaining, lifting the Warriors to a 107–106 win over the Phoenix Suns.

In the 2015 NBA Playoffs, Barnes had a quiet breakout performance in the Warriors' series against the Memphis Grizzlies. He averaged 12.8 points per game, while shooting 54.4% from the field, a performance lauded by many basketball insiders due to the reputation of the Grizzlies' defense. In Games 4, 5, and 6, Barnes made several key plays in clutch situations. When the Warriors were losing by double digits in the first quarter of Game 5, Barnes got the comeback started with several key shots, which turned into a rout once teammate Stephen Curry was able to shoulder much of the load. On May 27, in the Warriors' Western Conference Finals clinching Game 5 win, Barnes scored 24 points to help lead his team to the NBA Finals for the first time in 40 years. Barnes won his first NBA championship with the Warriors after they defeated the Cleveland Cavaliers in the 2015 NBA Finals in six games.

2015–16 season: NBA record for wins

Barnes helped the Warriors go 17–0 to start the season before a sprained left ankle ruled him out for 16 straight games. He returned to action on January 4 against the Charlotte Hornets, scoring eight points off the bench in a 111–101 win. On April 7, Barnes scored 21 points against the San Antonio Spurs, scoring in double figures for a ninth straight game, a career high. The win made the Warriors the second team in NBA history to win 70 games in a season. The Warriors went on to win an NBA record 73 games, eclipsing the 72–10 record set by the 1995–96 Chicago Bulls.

Through the first two rounds of the playoffs, Barnes shot just 36% from the field. In the Western Conference Finals against the Oklahoma City Thunder, Barnes shot 48% from the field while averaging 8.7 points per game to help the Warriors defeat the Thunder in seven games after overcoming a 3–1 deficit to advance to the 2016 NBA Finals. In Game 1 of the NBA Finals against the Cleveland Cavaliers, Barnes had a 13-point performance to help the Warriors win 104–89. Despite the Warriors going up 3–1 in the series following a Game 4 win, they went on to lose the series in seven games to become the first team in NBA history to lose the championship series after being up 3–1. Barnes only shot 16% in the last three games.

Dallas Mavericks (2016–2019)

2016–17 season
On July 9, 2016, Barnes signed a four-year, $94 million contract with the Dallas Mavericks. He made his debut for the Mavericks in their season opener on October 26, recording 19 points and nine rebounds in a 130–121 overtime loss to the Indiana Pacers. Two days later, he scored a career-high 31 points in a 106–98 loss to the Houston Rockets. He bested that mark on November 6, scoring 34 points in an 86–75 overtime win over the Milwaukee Bucks. Barnes scored 30 points or more seven times during the 2016–17 season, including five 31-point games. After never finishing better than fourth in scoring in his four seasons with the Golden State Warriors, Barnes led the Mavericks with a career-best 19.2 points per game.

2017–18 season
Barnes would again lead the Mavericks in scoring in 2017–2018, though the team finished 24–58 and 13th of 15 teams in the Western Conference. On November 7, 2017, Barnes scored a season-high 31 points against the Washington Wizards. He tied that mark on November 20 against the Boston Celtics. Two days later, Barnes banked a 30-footer as the horn sounded to lift the Mavericks to a 95–94 victory over the Memphis Grizzlies. Barnes led the Mavericks with 22 points, nine of them coming in the fourth quarter to help Dallas thwart a late Memphis comeback. On December 26, 2017, he tied his career high with his sixth double-double of the season after registering 16 points and 10 rebounds in a 98–93 win over the Toronto Raptors. He previously achieved it in Golden State's championship season of 2014–15. On January 10, 2018, he had 13 of his 25 points in the fourth quarter of the Mavericks' 115–111 win over the Charlotte Hornets. He made all five of his shots in the fourth quarter and added 11 rebounds. He finished the season with eight double-doubles, setting a new personal best.

2018–19 season
Barnes missed the first four games of the 2018–19 season because of a strained right hamstring. In his season debut on October 26, he shot 5 for 17 and scored 14 points in a 116–107 loss to the Raptors. On December 2, he scored a season-high 30 points in a 114–110 win over the Los Angeles Clippers. On December 31, he scored 25 points and matched his career high with seven 3-pointers in nine attempts in a 122–102 loss to the Oklahoma City Thunder.

Sacramento Kings (2019–present)
On February 6, 2019, while in the middle of a game for Dallas against the Charlotte Hornets, Barnes was traded to the Sacramento Kings in exchange for Zach Randolph and Justin Jackson. He made his debut for the Kings two days later, scoring 12 points in a 102–96 win over the Miami Heat. Barnes signed a four-year, $85 million contract extension with the Sacramento Kings following the 2019 season.

On July 14, 2020, he tested positive for COVID-19.

On March 27, 2021, Barnes hit a game-winning fadeaway three-pointer at the buzzer to secure victory for the Kings over the Cleveland Cavaliers, 100–98. 

On October 20, 2021, Barnes scored a game-leading 36 points, including a career-high eight three-point shots, during a 124–121 win over the Portland Trail Blazers. On October 27, Barnes hit a game-winning fadeaway three pointer to secure victory for the Kings against the Phoenix Suns, 110–107.

On November 20, 2022, Barnes scored 27 points and grabbed nine rebounds during a 137–129 win over the Detroit Pistons.

Career statistics

NBA

Regular season

|-
| style="text-align:left;"| 
| style="text-align:left;"| Golden State
| 81 || 81 || 25.4 || .439 || .359 || .758 || 4.1 || 1.2 || .6 || .2 || 9.2
|-
| style="text-align:left;"| 
| style="text-align:left;"| Golden State
| 78 || 24 || 28.3 || .399 || .347 || .718 || 4.0 || 1.5 || .8 || .3 || 9.5
|-
| style="text-align:left;background:#afe6ba;"| †
| style="text-align:left;"| Golden State
| style="background:#cfecec;"|  82* || style="background:#cfecec;"|82* || 28.3 || .482 || .405 || .720 || 5.5 || 1.4 || .7 || .2 || 10.1
|-
| style="text-align:left;"| 
| style="text-align:left;"| Golden State
| 66 || 59 || 30.9 || .466 || .383 || .761 || 4.9 || 1.8 || .6 || .2 || 11.7
|-
| style="text-align:left;"| 
| style="text-align:left;"| Dallas
| 79 || 79 || 35.5 || .468 || .351 || .861 || 5.0 || 1.5 || .8 || .2 || 19.2
|-
| style="text-align:left;"| 
| style="text-align:left;"| Dallas
| 77 || 77 || 34.2 || .445 || .357 || .827 || 6.1 || 2.0 || .6 || .2 || 18.9
|-
| style="text-align:left;"| 
| style="text-align:left;"| Dallas
| 49 || 49 || 32.3 || .404 || .389 || .833 || 4.2 || 1.3 || .7 || .2 || 17.7
|-
| style="text-align:left;"| 
| style="text-align:left;"| Sacramento
| 28 || 28 || 33.9 || .455 || .408 || .800 || 5.5 || 1.9 || .6 || .1 || 14.3
|-
| style="text-align:left;"| 
| style="text-align:left;"| Sacramento
| 72 || 72 || 34.5 || .460 || .381 || .801 || 4.9 || 2.2 || .6 || .2 || 14.5
|-
| style="text-align:left;"| 
| style="text-align:left;"| Sacramento
| 58 || 58 || 36.2 || .497 || .391 || .830 || 6.6 || 3.5 || .7 || .2 || 16.1
|-
| style="text-align:left;"| 
| style="text-align:left;"| Sacramento
| 77 || 77 || 33.6 || .469 || .394 || .826 || 5.6 || 2.4 || .7 || .2 || 16.4
|- class="sortbottom"
| style="text-align:center;" colspan="2"| Career
| 747 || 686 || 31.8 || .453 || .379 || .804 || 5.1 || 1.8 || .7 || .2 || 14.1

Playoffs

|-
| style="text-align:left;"| 2013
| style="text-align:left;"| Golden State
| 12 || 12 || 38.4 || .444 || .365 || .857 || 6.4 || 1.3 || .6 || .4 || 16.1
|-
| style="text-align:left;"| 2014
| style="text-align:left;"| Golden State
| 7 || 0 || 22.3 || .396 || .381 || .563 || 4.0 || 1.1 || .1 || .4 || 7.9
|-
| style="text-align:left;background:#afe6ba;"| 2015†
| style="text-align:left;"| Golden State
| 21 || 21 || 32.4 || .440 || .355 || .735 || 5.2 || 1.5 || .8 || .5 || 10.6
|-
| style="text-align:left;"| 2016
| style="text-align:left;"| Golden State
| 24 || 23 || 31.0 || .385 || .342 || .765 || 4.7 || 1.3 || .7 || .2 || 9.0
|- class="sortbottom"
| style="text-align:center;" colspan="2"| Career
| 64 || 56 || 31.9 || .419 || .355 || .756 || 5.1 || 1.3 || .7 || .4 || 10.7

College

|-
| style="text-align:left;"| 2010–11
| style="text-align:left;"| North Carolina
| 37 || 36 || 29.4 || .423 || .344 || .750 || 5.8 || 1.4 || .7 || .4 || 15.7
|-
| style="text-align:left;"| 2011–12
| style="text-align:left;"| North Carolina
| 38 || 37 || 29.2 || .440 || .358 || .723 || 5.2 || 1.1 || 1.1 || .3 || 17.1
|- class="sortbottom"
| style="text-align:center;" colspan="2"| Career
| 75 || 73 || 29.3 || .431 || .349 || .734 || 5.5 || 1.3 || .9 || .4 || 16.4

National team career
In June 2016, Barnes was named in the United States national team for the 2016 Summer Olympics. He helped Team USA win the gold medal in Rio, and in four games, he averaged 4.3 points and 2.1 rebounds per game.

In August 2019, Barnes was named as part of the United States national team for the 2019 FIBA World Cup. He helped team USA to a 6–2 record and a seventh-place finish in the tournament, losing in the quarter-final round to France and in the fifth place game to Serbia before rallying to win the seventh place game against Poland. Barnes averaged 11.6 points and 4.6 rebounds per game.

Awards and honors

High school
2010 Morgan Wootten Player of the Year Award winner
2010 McDonald's All-American team selection
2010 Jordan Brand High School All-American team selection
2010 First-team Parade All-American
2010 Iowa Mr. Basketball
2009 Second-team Parade All-American

College
2010, 2011 Preseason All-American
2011 Second Team All-ACC
2011 All-ACC Freshman Team
2011 ACC Rookie of the Year
2012 Second Team All-American (NABC)
2012 First Team All-ACC

Professional
2015 NBA Champion
2013 NBA All-Rookie First Team

Personal life
Barnes is a Christian. He is also a teetotaler; he had his first sip of alcohol after winning the 2015 NBA Finals. On July 29, 2017, at Rosecliff in Newport, Rhode Island, he married Brittany Johnson.

On September 15, 2022 his high school alma mater honored Barnes for his career and community support by naming the gymnasium and basketball court at the new high school after him and electing him to the school’s Hall of Fame.

See also

References

External links

North Carolina Tar Heels bio

1992 births
Living people
2019 FIBA Basketball World Cup players
African-American basketball players
African-American Christians
All-American college men's basketball players
American men's basketball players
Ames High School alumni
Basketball players at the 2016 Summer Olympics
Basketball players from Iowa
Dallas Mavericks players
Golden State Warriors draft picks
Golden State Warriors players
McDonald's High School All-Americans
Medalists at the 2016 Summer Olympics
North Carolina Tar Heels men's basketball players
Olympic gold medalists for the United States in basketball
Parade High School All-Americans (boys' basketball)
Sacramento Kings players
Small forwards
Sportspeople from Ames, Iowa
United States men's national basketball team players
21st-century African-American sportspeople